Haley Cope (born April 11, 1979), also known by her married name Haley Clark, is an American former competition swimmer, Olympic medalist, and former world record-holder.  She won a silver medal at the 2004 Summer Olympics, eight world championship medals, and held a world record in the 50-meter backstroke.

College career
Cope attended the University of California, Berkeley, where she swam for coach Teri McKeever's California Golden Bears swimming and diving team from 1998 to 2001. In 2000, she was named the Pacific-10 Conference swimmer of the year, and helped lead California to a fourth-place finish nationally.  At the 2000 NCAA national championships in Indianapolis, she swam the 50-meter backstroke in 27.25 seconds, breaking Sandra Völker's short-course world record.  She graduated in 2001 with a bachelor's degree in mass communications.  In 2001, she won a gold medal in the 50-meter backstroke at the World Aquatics Championship, and two medals at the final Goodwill Games.  Her 50-meter backstroke performance at the Goodwill Games was a record time for the competition.

Olympics, World and Short Course World Championships
After graduating from Berkeley, Cope continued her swimming career, winning her second short course worlds title at the 2002 Short Course World Swimming Championships held in Moscow. She won gold medal in the 100 backstroke, and two silver medals in the 50 backstroke, and the 4×100-meter medley relay, in which she swam the backstroke leg.  In 2003, she swam at her second long course World Championships in Barcelona, where she won a silver medal in the 4×100-meter medley relay.

At the 2004 Summer Olympics, held in Athens, Greece, Cope swam the backstroke in the preliminary heat of the women's 4×100-meter medley relay.  In the finals, the American team took second place, and Cope was awarded a silver medal.

Cope's last major international competition was in October 2004, at the 2004 Short Course World Swimming Championships in Indianapolis.  In Indianapolis, she repeated as champion in the 100-meter backstroke, as well as winning the 50 backstroke. As part of the American team, she won a silver medal in the 4×100-meter medley relay.

Personal life
Cope married her former coach, Brian Clark, in 2002, and has four children. She is currently operating a swimming school in Chico called Water Sprites Swim School. She posed nude for the September 2004 issue of Playboy magazine.

See also

 List of Olympic medalists in swimming (women)
 List of University of California, Berkeley alumni
 List of World Aquatics Championships medalists in swimming (women)
 World record progression 50 metres backstroke

References

External links
 
 
 
 

1979 births
Living people
American female backstroke swimmers
American female freestyle swimmers
California Golden Bears women's swimmers
World record setters in swimming
Medalists at the FINA World Swimming Championships (25 m)
Medalists at the 2004 Summer Olympics
Olympic silver medalists for the United States in swimming
Sportspeople from Chico, California
Swimmers from California
Swimmers at the 2004 Summer Olympics
World Aquatics Championships medalists in swimming
Goodwill Games medalists in swimming
Competitors at the 2001 Goodwill Games